The diving portion of the 2013 World Aquatics Championships was held from 20–28 July 2013 at the Piscina Municipal de Montjuïc in Barcelona, Spain.

Events
The following events were contested by both men and women in Barcelona:
 1 m springboard
 3 m springboard
 10 m platform
 3 m springboard synchronized
 10 m platform synchronized

Individual events consisted of preliminaries, semifinals and finals. The order of divers in the preliminary round were determined by computerized random selection, during the technical meeting. The 18 divers with the highest scores in the preliminaries proceed to the semifinals.

The semifinal consisted of the top 18 ranked divers from the preliminary competition and the final consisted of the top 12 ranked divers from the semifinal.

Schedule

Medal summary

Medal table
 Host nation

Men

Women

Participating nations

References

External links
 Official website

 
Diving
Diving at the World Aquatics Championships
World Aquatics Championships